Scotia Iron Furnace Stack is a historic iron furnace stack located near Leasburg, Crawford County, Missouri. It was built about 1870 by the Scotia Iron Works, and is 35 feet wide at the base, and approximately 40 feet high.  It is constructed of native limestone blocks.  The furnace remained in operation until 1880.

It was listed on the National Register of Historic Places in 1969.

References

Ironworks and steel mills in the United States
Industrial buildings and structures on the National Register of Historic Places in Missouri
Industrial buildings completed in 1870
Buildings and structures in Crawford County, Missouri
National Register of Historic Places in Crawford County, Missouri
Furnaces
1870 establishments in Missouri